Nese is a village in northern Italy. It is a frazione of the comune of Alzano Lombardo. It has around 4000 inhabitants.

Cities and towns in Lombardy